Sant'Albino is a village in Tuscany, central Italy, administratively a frazione of the comune of Montepulciano, province of Siena. At the time of the 2001 census its population was 1,175.

Sant'Albino is about 67 km from Siena and 5 km from Montepulciano.

References 

Frazioni of Montepulciano